Xenophon is a small lunar impact crater that lies across the southern rim of the walled plain Fermi, to the west of the crater Tsiolkovskiy. South of Xenophon is Zhiritskiy F, a satellite crater of Zhiritskiy to the south-southwest.

The rim of this crater is eroded and crossed by several small craters, especially along the western edge. The interior floor is relatively featureless.

This crater is located on the far side of the Moon and cannot be seen directly from the Earth.

References

External links
 LTO-101B4 Babakin — L&PI topographic map

Impact craters on the Moon